Statistics of Swedish football Division 3 for the 2006 season.

League standings

Norra Norrland 2006

Mellersta Norrland 2006

Södra Norrland 2006

Norra Svealand 2006

Östra Svealand 2006

Västra Svealand 2006

Nordöstra Götaland 2006

Nordvästra Götaland 2006

Mellersta Götaland 2006

Sydöstra Götaland 2006

Sydvästra Götaland 2006

Södra Götaland 2006

Footnotes

References 

Swedish Football Division 3 seasons
5
Sweden
Sweden